Straubel is a surname of German origin that may refer to the following notable people:

 Austin Straubel (1904–1942), American Air Force officer, name giver of the Austin Straubel International Airport (Brown County, Wisconsin)
 Bodo Straubel (born 1958),(de) German classic cycling racer
 J. B. Straubel (born 1975), American engineer

German-language surnames